José Vaquerizo Relucio (born 10 October 1978 in Valencia) is a boccia player from Spain. He has not always had a job. He has a physical disability: He has cerebral palsy and is a BC1 type athlete.  He competed at the 2008 Summer Paralympics. His team finished third in the Team BC1-2 game.

References

External links 
 
 

1978 births
Living people
Spanish boccia players
Paralympic bronze medalists for Spain
Paralympic boccia players of Spain
Paralympic medalists in boccia
Boccia players at the 2008 Summer Paralympics
Medalists at the 2008 Summer Paralympics
People from Valencia